This is a list of provinces of Angola by Human Development Index as of 2021.

References 

Angola
Angola
Human Development Index
Provinces by Human Development Index